Yu with acute (Ю́ ю́) is a letter used in some East Slavic languages. It indicates a stressed Yu. For example, in Russian, it can be used in the word узнаю́, meaning 'I am recognising it'. However, in Russian, the acute accent is usually only used in dictionaries or children's books.

References

Cyrillic letters with diacritics